Korean International School in Yanbian (KISY; Korean: 연변한국국제학교) is a Korean international school in Yanji, Yanbian, Jilin, China. It serves students in elementary school through high school.

It was established on December 1, 1997. Prior to its opening, the Korean students in Yanji attended Yanbian International Academy, an English-language international school.

See also

 Koreans in China

References

External links
 Korean International School in Yanbian—

Korean international schools in China
High schools in Jilin
Buildings and structures in Yanbian
Education in Yanbian
1997 establishments in China
Educational institutions established in 1997